The India-China Division (ICD) is an inactive United States Air Force unit. Its last assignment was with the Air Transport Command, stationed at Dum Dum Airport Calcutta, British India. It was inactivated in 1946. The organization was formed as the India-China Wing, ATC (ICWATC) from a consolidation of equipment and personnel of former units of the disbanded India-China Ferry Command in December 1942, which had been established in July 1942 by the Tenth Air Force to transport materiel to China over the Himalayan Mountains ("The Hump").

ICWATC was one of nine overseas transport wings of ATC's Air Transportation Division, reporting directly to Division headquarters and not subject to control by theater commanders. It was also one of the few ATC wings to have its own assigned aircraft under the direct command of the wing commander. In July 1944 ATC reorganized worldwide and the nine wings became divisions. ICWATC became the India-China Division, with its Eastern and Western Sectors redesignated the Assam and India Wings respectively. Its mission was the air transport of supplies, personnel, equipment and aircraft within India and China during World War II.

Between 1 December 1942 and 1 December 1943 its flying components were transport groups and squadrons. After that ATC discarded the standard TO&E group/squadron structure for its units and adopted a more flexible "exact manning" system, identifying its units by their station number designation until August 1944, when it converted to the service-wide Army Air Force Base Unit system of designating non-combat units.

The organization began with two stations (Dinjan and Chabua) and three others under construction, operating less than 60 aircraft. By August 1945 ICD had expanded to more than 60 Base Units, 640 aircraft, and 34,000 personnel. On 29 January 1944 the ICWATC became the first non-combat organization to be awarded the Presidential Unit Citation, at the personal direction of President Franklin Delano Roosevelt, for its efforts flying the Hump.

History

Lineage
 Constituted as the India-China Wing, Air Transport Command
 Activated on 1 December 1942
 Redesignated India-China Division, Air Transport Command on 1 July 1944
 Inactivated on 15 February 1946

Assignments
 Air Transport Command, 1 December 1942 – 1946

Components
1 December 1942 to 1 December 1943

 1st Ferrying Group
 3d Ferrying Squadron
 6th Ferrying Squadron
 13th Ferrying Squadron
 Dinjan Airfield, Assam, India
 22d Transport Group
 77th Transport Squadron
 78th Transport Squadron
 88th Transport Squadron
 Jorhat Airfield, Assam, India
 28th Transport Group
 96th Transport Squadron
 97th Transport Squadron
 98th Transport Squadron
 Tezpur Airfield, Assam, India

 29th Transport Group
 13th Ferrying Squadron
 99th Transport Squadron
 100th Transport Squadron
 301st Transport Squadron
 Sookerating Airfield, Assam, India
 30th Transport Group
 302d Transport Squadron
 303d Transport Squadron
 304th Transport Squadron
 Mohanbari Airfield, Assam, India

Stations

See also 

 China Burma India Theater
 Chinese Army in India
 South Atlantic air ferry route in World War II

Notes

References

Citations

Sources 
 
 The Army Almanac, Armed Forces Information School (U.S), Washington. D.C.: U.S. G.P.O., 1950
 India-China Wing
 USAAF 14th Air Force Airfields in China, 1942-1946

Military units and formations of the United States Army Air Forces